The Logical Structure of Linguistic Theory or LSLT is a major work in linguistics by American linguist Noam Chomsky. It was written in 1955 and published in 1975. In 1955, Chomsky submitted a part of this book as his PhD thesis titled Transformational Analysis, setting out his ideas on transformational grammar; he was awarded a Ph.D. for it, and it was privately distributed among specialists on microfilm. Chomsky offered the manuscript of LSLT for publication, but MIT's Technology Press refused to publish it. It was published by Springer in 1975.

References

External links
 The Logical Structure of Linguistic Theory preview in Google Books

Books by Noam Chomsky
Cognitive science literature
1975 non-fiction books
Syntax books
Philosophy of logic
Theses